Pewsey Vale School is a small, mixed secondary school in Pewsey, Wiltshire, England, for children aged 11 to 16. It became an academy in July 2011.

The school is described by Ofsted as "smaller than the average secondary school". Since 2017, the headteacher has been Neil Pritchard.

History
The school opened on a new site in 1958 as Pewsey Vale Secondary Modern School. Until this time, the schools in Pewsey and the surrounding villages were elementary (all-age) schools but in 1956 they transferred their pupils aged 11 and over to the new school, and all became junior schools. In 1970 a swimming pool and sports hall were built alongside the school, with shared school and public use.

In 1975 the school became a comprehensive under the new name of Pewsey Vale School. Extensive modernisation and expansion of the school took place at this time. There were 407 pupils in 1996 and 426 in 2002. There is no sixth form and children go to Marlborough, Devizes or elsewhere at 16; the school has links with the agricultural branch of Wiltshire College, at Lackham near Chippenham.

In 2011 the school converted to academy status.

Ofsted inspection 
The school was inspected by Ofsted in June 2019, and it received the following grades which were unchanged from the 2017 inspection.

References

External links
 

Academies in Wiltshire
Secondary schools in Wiltshire
Educational institutions established in 1958
1958 establishments in England